This article presents a list of the historical events and publications of Australian literature during 1968.

Major publications

Books 
 Thea Astley – A Boat Load of Home Folk
 A. Bertram Chandler – Spartan Planet (aka False Fatherland)
 Kenneth Cook – The Wine of God's Anger
 Frank Dalby Davison – The White Thorntree
 Geoffrey Dutton – Andy
 David Ireland – The Chantic Bird
 Thomas Keneally – Three Cheers for the Paraclete
 Norman Lindsay – Rooms and Houses
 John O'Grady – Gone Troppo
 Morris West – The Tower of Babel

Short stories 
 John Baxter – The Pacific Book of Australian Science Fiction (edited)
 Louise Elizabeth Rorabacher – Aliens in Their Land : The Aborigine in the Australian Short Story (edited)
 Patrick White – "Five-Twenty"
 Michael Wilding – "Joe's Absence"

Children's and Young Adult fiction 
 Margaret Balderson – When Jays Fly to Barbmo
 Nan Chauncy – Lizzie Lights
 Mavis Thorpe Clark – Spark of Opal
 Elyne Mitchell – Moon Filly
 Ruth Park – The Sixpenny Island
 Ivan Southall – Let the Balloon Go
 Joan Woodberry
 Ash Tuesday
 Come Back Peter
 Patricia Wrightson – I Own the Racecourse!

Poetry 

 David Campbell
 "The Australian Dream"
 Selected Poems 1942-1968
 Bruce Dawe
An Eye for a Tooth : Poems
 "Homecoming"
 Gwen Harwood – Poems : Volume 2
 Dorothy Hewett – Windmill Country
 James McAuley – "Because"
 Randolph Stow – "The Singing Bones"

Biography 
 T. Inglis Moore – Rolf Boldrewood
 Colin Thiele – Heysen of Hahndorf

Non-fiction 
 Gavin Souter – A Peculiar People : The Australians in Paraguay
 Margaret Fulton – The Margaret Fulton Cookbook

Awards and honours

Literary

Children and Young Adult

Poetry

Births 
A list, ordered by date of birth (and, if the date is either unspecified or repeated, ordered alphabetically by surname) of births in 1968 of Australian literary figures, authors of written works or literature-related individuals follows, including year of death.

 23 February — Sonya Hartnett, novelist
 2 April — Sofie Laguna, novelist

Unknown date

 Anita Heiss, academic and critic
James Roy, writer of young adult and children's fiction
 Chris Womersley, novelist

Deaths 
A list, ordered by date of death (and, if the date is either unspecified or repeated, ordered alphabetically by surname) of deaths in 1968 of Australian literary figures, authors of written works or literature-related individuals follows, including year of birth.

 14 January – Dorothea Mackellar, poet (born 1885)
 9 June – Bernard Cronin, novelist (born 1884)

See also 
 1968 in Australia
 1968 in literature
 1968 in poetry
 List of years in Australian literature
List of years in literature

References

 
Australian literature by year
20th-century Australian literature
1968 in literature